Helmi Anni Krohn, also Helmi Setälä (31 October 1871 – 18 October 1967), was a Finnish writer and translator who wrote fiction, biographies and children’s books. She was also an editor and publisher.

Biography
Krohn was born in Helsinki in 1871 to Julius Krohn. Her father's original language was German but he became a professor of Finnish literature. He died in a sailing accident when she was a teenager. Krohn's brother, Kaarle Krohn was a folklorist whilst her sister, Aino Kallas, was another noted writer.

In 1892 Helmi Krohn married the politician Eemil Nestor Setälä and took the name Setälä. During the marriage she had written Surun lapsi (Child of Sorrow) which, as she later explained to a friend, prof. Zachris Castren, was as autobiographical as she dare. The book describes a woman who was surprised to find the “secrets of marriage.” The heroine, like Helmi, was annoyed that her parents had not told her about sexuality and what happened inside marriage. Helmi commented that writing the book had been a release for her. She describes that book as a "child of joy".

Krohn also wrote letters to Erkki Melartin and Jalmari Finne after 1906 which supply details of her ideas. The following year she became the editor of the magazine Lapland which was a job she held until 1935. From 1909 to 1910 she was the editor-in-chief of the journal Valvoja.

Her divorce in 1913 was an unusual occurrence in Finland at the time. The divorce created financial concerns and she created her first biography that year of the "first Finnish woman poet," Isa Asp. She worked as an editor at the publishing company Otava from 1912 to 1919.

Krohn was an advocate for Spiritualism. In 1950 she translated into English a book by Einer Nielsen who was a Danish spiritualist, discredited as a fraud. The book Solid Proofs of Survival was his last work and it was published by the Psychic Book Club.

Krohn died in Helsinki in 1967.

References

1871 births
1967 deaths
Writers from Helsinki
20th-century Finnish women writers
Finnish editors
Finnish women editors
Finnish publishers (people)
Finnish biographers
Women biographers
Finnish people of German descent
Spiritualists